Oreste Fares (1885–1950) was an Italian stage and film actor.

Selected filmography
 Before the Jury (1931)
 Venus (1932)
 Villafranca (1934)
 Red Passport (1935)
 Cavalry (1936)
 To Live (1937)
 The Last Enemy (1938)
 Antonio Meucci (1940)
 Kean (1940)
 Manon Lescaut (1940)
 Big Shoes (1940)
 Beyond Love (1940)
 The King's Jester (1941)
 First Love (1941)
 The Queen of Navarre (1942)
 Girl of the Golden West (1942)
 Luisa Sanfelice (1942)
 Rossini (1942)
 The Last Wagon (1943)
 Resurrection (1944)
 The Priest's Hat (1944)
 A Yank in Rome (1946)
 The Courier of the King (1947)
 Hawk of the Nile (1950)
 Pact with the Devil (1950)

References

Bibliography
 Landy, Marcia. The Folklore of Consensus: Theatricality in the Italian Cinema, 1930-1943. SUNY Press, 1998.

External links

1885 births
1950 deaths
Italian male stage actors
Italian male film actors
Male actors from Rome